Joanna Simon may refer to:

Joanna Simon (mezzo-soprano) (1936–2022), American mezzo-soprano opera singer
Joanna Simon (wine writer), British author and wine columnist

See also
Jo Anne Simon (born 1970), American attorney and politician